The Third Ruijs de Beerenbrouck cabinet was the cabinet of the Netherlands from 10 August 1929 until 26 May 1933. The cabinet was formed by the political parties Roman Catholic State Party (RKSP), Anti-Revolutionary Party (ARP) and the Christian Historical Union (CHU) after the election of 1929. The centre-right cabinet was a majority government in the House of Representatives. It was the last of three cabinets of Charles Ruijs de Beerenbrouck, the Leader of the Roman Catholic State Party as Prime Minister.

Cabinet Members

 Retained this position from the previous cabinet.
 Served ad interim.
 Appointment: Frans Beelaerts van Blokland appointed Vice-President of the Council of State.

References

External links
Official

  Kabinet-Ruijs de Beerenbrouck III Parlement & Politiek

Cabinets of the Netherlands
1929 establishments in the Netherlands
1933 disestablishments in the Netherlands
Cabinets established in 1929
Cabinets disestablished in 1933